This is a list of notable people who were born or have lived in Omsk, Russia.

Born in Omsk

19th century

1801–1850 
 Nikolai Yadrintsev (1842–1894), Russian public figure, explorer, archaeologist and turkologist

1851–1900 
 Innokenty Annensky (1855–1909), Russian poet, critic and translator
 Mikhail Vrubel (1856–1910), Russian painter
 Wacław Iwaszkiewicz-Rudoszański (1871–1922), Polish general
 Dmitry Karbyshev (1880–1945), officer of the Russian Imperial Army, Red Army general, professor of the Soviet General Staff Academy (Doctor of Military Sciences) and Hero of the Soviet Union (posthumously)
 Valerian Kuybyshev (1888–1935), Russian revolutionary, Red Army officer and prominent Soviet politician
 Anatol Josepho (1894–1980), Russian immigrant, who invented and patented the first automated photo booth in 1925, which was named the "Photomaton"

20th century

1901–1950 
 Vissarion Shebalin (1902–1963), Soviet composer
 Leonid Martynov (1905–1980), Russian poet
 Nina Arkhipova (1921–2016), Soviet and Russian film and stage actress
 Valentina Talyzina (born 1935), Soviet and Russian film and stage actress
 Yuri Titov (born 1935), Russian gymnast, Olympic champion and four times world champion
 Vladimir Lukin (born 1937), Russian liberal political activist
 Vladislav Dvorzhetsky (1939–1978), Soviet film actor
 Igor Berezovsky (1942–2007), Russian painter, printmaker and graphic designer
 Viktor Igumenov (born 1943), Russian wrestler
 Vitaly Tseshkovsky (1944–2011), Russian chess Grandmaster and a former champion of the USSR
 Viktor Blinov (1945–1968), Soviet ice hockey player
 Yuri Shatalov (born 1945), Soviet ice hockey player
 Viktor Bazhenov (born 1946), Soviet fencer
 Nikolai Kormiltsev (born 1946), Commander-in-Chief of the Russian Ground Forces from 2001 to 2004
 Lyubov Polishchuk (1949–2006), Russian actress
 Vera Krasnova (born 1950), Russian speed skater

1951–1960 
 Eduard Rapp (born 1951), Soviet cyclist
 Vladimir Yumin (1951–2016), Soviet Russian wrestler and Olympic champion in freestyle wrestling
 Alexander Gorban (born 1952), British scientist of Russian origin
 Aleksandr Ivchenko (born 1952), Russian professional football coach and a former player
 Galima Shugurova (born 1953), Soviet rhythmic gymnast
 Vilis Krištopans (born 1954), Latvian politician
 Tamāra Vilerte (born 1954), Latvian chess player
 Anatoly Antonov (born 1955), Russian deputy minister of defence
 Aleksandr Muzychenko (born 1955), Soviet/Russian sailor, Olympic champion for the USSR team
 Alexander Ivanov (born 1956), Russian American chess Grandmaster
 Viktor Ivanov (born 1960), Russian football player

1961–1970 
 Sergei Chikishev (born 1961), Russian football manager and a former player
 Oleg Imrekov (1962–2014), Russian professional footballer
 Valery Babanov (born 1964), Russian mountaineer
 Yegor Letov (1964–2008), Russian poet, musician, singer-songwriter, audio engineer and conceptual art painter
 Alexander Volkov (born 1964), Soviet-Ukraine professional basketball player of Russian ethnicity
 Andrey Antropov (born 1967), Russian male badminton player
 Oleg Maltsev (born 1967), Russian judoka
 Igor Khankeyev (born 1968), Russian professional football coach and a former player
 Marat Mulashev (born 1968), Russian professional football coach and a former player
 Sergei Osipov (born 1968), Russian professional football coach and a former player
 Viacheslav Zakhartsov (born 1968), Russian chess Grandmaster
 Tatiana Druchinina (born 1969), Soviet rhythmic gymnast
 Abdul-Vahed Niyazov (born 1969), Russian businessman
 Siman Povarenkin (born 1969), Russian entrepreneur
 Vladimir Shcherbak (born 1970), Russian football manager
 Konstantin Ushakov (born 1970), Russian volleyball player
Natalya Starovoyt (born 1962), actress of Penza Oblast Drama Theatre

1971–1980 
 Konstantin Landa (born 1972), Russian chess Grandmaster
 Alexei Makarov (born 1972), Russian actor of theatre and cinema
 Kirill Petrenko (born 1972), Russian-Austrian conductor
 Andrey Morev (born 1973), Russian-Kazakhstani football goalkeeper
 Natalia Goudkova (born 1974), Russian Paralympian athlete
 Andrey Korneyev (1974–2014), Russian breaststroke swimmer
 Oleg Kuleshov (born 1974), Russian handball player
 Dimitri Lykin (born 1974), Russian sport shooter
 Dmitry Chernyshyov (born 1975), Russian swimmer
 Denis Pimankov (born 1975), Russian freestyle swimmer
 Tatyana Tishchenko (born 1975), Russian sprint canoer
 Olga Nazarova (born 1977), Russian-born Belarusian biathlete
 Anastasija Reiberger (born 1977), Russian-born German pole vaulter
 Aleksei Martynov (born 1978), Russian professional footballer
 Ludmilla Radchenko (born 1978), Russian model, artist and actress
 Dennis Siver (born 1979), Russian-German mixed martial artist
 Eduard Kunz (born 1980), Russian pianist
 Alexander Sazonov (born 1980), Russian professional ice hockey defenceman
 Roman Sludnov (born 1980), Russian breaststroke swimmer
 Eduard Troyanovsky (born 1980), Russian professional boxer and IBF and IBO junior welterweight champion

1981–1990

1981–1985 
 Konstantin Baranov (born 1982), Russian professional ice hockey player
 Elena Chistilina (born 1982), Russian Paralympic athlete
 Dmitry Kovalyov (born 1982), Russian handball player
 Alexander Svitov (born 1982), Russian professional ice hockey forward
 Irina Tchachina (born 1982), Russian individual rhythmic gymnast
 Nina Yevteyeva (born 1982), Russian short track speed skater
 Olga Graf (born 1983), Russian speed skater
 Dmitry Jakovenko (born 1983), Russian chess grandmaster
 Denis Kulyash (born 1983), Russian professional ice hockey defenceman
 Valentina Savchenkova (born 1983), Russian football defender
 Dmitri Sychev (born 1983), Russian association footballer
 Andrei Taratukhin (born 1983), Russian professional ice hockey centre
 Tatiana Borodulina (born 1984), Russian short-track speed skater
 Elena Ivashchenko (1984–2013), Russian judoka
 Vladimir Leshonok (born 1984), Russian professional footballer
 Yuri Mamaev (born 1984), Russian football midfielder
 Aleksandr Novikov (born 1984), Russian professional football player
 Alexander Shlemenko (born 1984), Russian mixed martial artist
 Aleksei Tishchenko (born 1984), Russian amateur boxer
 Dmitri Poline (born 1985), Russian paralympic swimmer
 Yanina Studilina (born 1985), Russian theater and film actress, fashion model, TV presenter

1986–1990 
 Evgeny Dubrovin (born 1986), Russian professional ice hockey defenceman
 Nikita Nikitin (born 1986), Russian professional ice hockey defenseman
 Vladimir Pervushin (born 1986), Russian professional ice hockey forward
 Arkadi Sergeev (born 1986), Russian competitive ice dancer
 Petr Ignatenko (born 1987), Russian professional road racing cyclist
 Vladimir Ponomaryov (born 1987), Russian professional football player
 Vlada Roslyakova (born 1987), Russian model
 Andrey Vorontsevich (born 1987), Russian professional basketball player
 Oleg Zhestkov (born 1987), Russian sprint canoeist
 Vladimir Dyadyun (born 1988), Russian football striker
 Alexei Ivanov (born 1988), Kazakhstani professional ice hockey goaltender of Russian ethnicity
 Nikita Konovalov (born 1988), Russian swimmer
 Lisa Ryzih (born 1988), Russian-born German pole vault athlete
 Egor Averin (born 1989), Russian professional ice hockey forward
 Igor Paderin (born 1989), Russian professional football player
 Anastasia Savchenko (born 1989), Russian pole vaulter
 Denis Shcherbak (born 1989), Russian professional footballer
 Kirill Startsev (born 1989), Russian professional ice hockey player
 Jana Beller (born 1990), Russian German model
 Yevgeniya Kanayeva (born 1990), Russian individual rhythmic gymnast
 Andrey Koreshkov (born 1990), Russian mixed martial artist
 Dmitri Malyaka (born 1990), Russian football player
 Eldar Ragib Ogly Mamedov (born 1990), Russian professional football player
 Samvel Mnatsyan (born 1990), Russian professional ice hockey defenceman
 Evgeny Orlov (born 1990), Russian professional ice hockey forward
 Anastasia Panchenko (born 1990), Russian sprint canoer
 Theo Vogelsang (born 1990), German footballer

1991–2000 
 Sergei Kalinin (born 1991), Russian professional ice hockey forward
 Dmitry Maltsev (born 1991), Russian ice hockey player
 Nikita Pivtsakin (born 1991), Russian professional ice hockey defenceman
 Nikita Prokhorov (born 1991), Russian athlete
 Eduard Reizvikh (born 1991), Russian professional ice hockey goaltender
 Roman Berdnikov (born 1992), Russian professional ice hockey player
 Darya Melnikova (born 1992), Russian actress of theater, film and television
 Kirill Rasskazov (born 1992), Russian ice hockey player
 Semyon Zherebtsov (born 1992), Russian professional ice hockey player
 Alexander Hahn (born 1993), German footballer
 Dmitri Jaškin (born 1993), Russian-born Czech ice hockey player
 Maxim Kazakov (born 1993), Russian professional ice hockey player
 Evgeny Mozer (born 1993), Russian professional ice hockey player
 Kirill Semyonov (born 1994), Russian professional ice hockey player
 Anna Shibanova (born 1994), Russian ice hockey defender
 Tatyana Shibanova (born 1994), Russian ice hockey player
 Ksenia Dudkina (born 1995), Russian group rhythmic gymnast
 Denis Kostin (born 1995), Russian professional ice hockey goaltender
 Vladislav Oslonovskiy (born 1995), Russian football midfielder
 Yegor Rudkovskiy (born 1996), Russian football player
 Vladislav Artemiev (born 1998), Russian chess player
 Vera Biryukova (born 1998), Russian group rhythmic gymnast
 Sofya Skomorokh (born 1999), Russian group rhythmic gymnast
 Mariia Kravtsova (born 2000), Russian group rhythmic gymnast

21st century 
 Polina Tsurskaya (born 2001), Russian competitive figure skater
 Anastasia Simakova (born 2004), Russian individual rhythmic gymnast

Lived in Omsk 

 Fyodor Dostoyevsky (1821–1881), Russian novelist, short story writer, essayist, journalist and philosopher; in exile 1849–1854
 Alexander Kolchak (1874–1920), Russian polar explorer and commander in the Imperial Russian Navy
 Vikentii Trofimov (1878–1956), Russian painter
 Mikhail Ulyanov (1927–2007), Soviet and Russian actor
 Vladimir Barnashov (born 1951), Soviet former biathlete
 Herman Gref (born 1964), Russian statesman and top manager; attended Omsk State University 1985–1990
 Jaromír Jágr (born in 1972), Czech ice hockey player, played in Avangard Omsk in 2008-2011.

See also 

 List of Russian people
 List of Russian-language poets

Omsk
List